Emmerich Schrenk (2 November 1915 - 2 October 1988) was an Austrian actor. He appeared in more than fifty films from 1949 to 1983.

Filmography

References

External links 

1915 births
1988 deaths
Austrian male film actors
Austrian male television actors
20th-century Austrian male actors